Henry Ernest Kendall, (April 29, 1864 – September 2, 1949), was a farmer, physician and politician who served as the 19th Lieutenant Governor of Nova Scotia from 1942 to 1947.

Kendall was the son of Samuel Frederick Kendall of Bristol, England and Emily Long of London. The couple settled in Sydney, Nova Scotia in 1857. Kendall, a member and pastor of the Plymouth Brethren, established the Union Church on Mitchell Island in 1866.

Kendall was widowed in June, 1909 following the death of his wife, Ida B Burchell. Ida's parents were George Burchell and Louisa Lorway from Sydney, Nova Scotia.   In 1913, he married Margaret McLennan, daughter of John Stewart McLennan, an industrialist who would be appointed to the Senate of Canada several years later.

During World War I, Kendall enlisted in the Canadian Expeditionary Force and served as Lieutenant Colonel of the 9th Stationary Hospital based at Bramshott Military Hospital in England from 1916 to 1919.

In the 1921 federal election, Kendall was an unsuccessful candidate for the Progressive Party of Canada in Hants riding.

He was appointed Lieutenant-Governor of Nova Scotia at the age of 78, the oldest person to hold the office in the province's history.

Kendall's brother, Arthur Samuel Kendall, was also a physician and served as both an MLA in the Nova Scotia House of Assembly and as a federal Member of Parliament.

His son, Jim Kendall (1889-1942), played hockey with the Montreal Wanderers 1906–1907, emigrating to Sydney, Australia (returned to Canada to serve during World War I) and later worked for Broken Hill Proprietary Company.

Kendall became a hockey great in his adopted home in Australia.

References

1864 births
1949 deaths
Lieutenant Governors of Nova Scotia
People from Sydney, Nova Scotia
Progressive Party of Canada candidates in the 1921 Canadian federal election
Canadian Expeditionary Force officers